Vere United F.C. is a Jamaican football team based in Clarendon. They currently play in the National Premier League after being promoted in 2019.

The club was formerly named Jamalco F.C. Jamalco played in the Premier League in 2016–17 after being promoted, finishing last, and was relegated.

References

Football clubs in Jamaica
Association football clubs established in 2010
2010 establishments in Jamaica